The subfamily Philanthinae is one of the largest groups in the wasp family Crabronidae, with about 1100 species in 9 genera, most of them in Cerceris; Alexander treats it as having only 8 genera. Historically, this subfamily has frequently been accorded family status. The subfamily consists of solitary, predatory wasps, each genus having its own distinct and consistent prey preferences. The adult females dig tunnels in the ground for nesting.

As with all other sphecoid wasps, the larvae are carnivorous; females hunt for prey on which to lays their eggs, mass provisioning the nest cells with paralyzed, living prey that the larva feeds upon after it hatches from the egg, as seen in the species Philanthus gibbosus.

References

External links
 BWARS: Philanthinae (photographs of each species)

Crabronidae
Apocrita subfamilies